A Time for Everything may refer to:

A Time to Every Purpose Under Heaven, also known as A Time for Everything, a 2004 novel by Karl Ove Knausgård
A Time for Everything, a 2009 album by Yaron Herman
"A Time For Everything", a song from the 2001 compilation Magic Time
"A Time For Everything", a single by Eldridge Holmes